Boetius Henry Sullivan, Sr. (November 18, 1885 - February 14, 1961) was a Chicago businessman and lawyer who reorganized the Sawyer Biscuit Company in 1925. He was known as "The Million Dollar Kid" for his charitable contributions while attending Yale University.

Biography
Boetius Henry Sullivan was born on November 18, 1885, to Roger Charles Sullivan and Helen Marie Quinlan in Chicago, Illinois. He attended Yale University and Harvard Law School, and on December 28, 1911 married Mary Loretta Connery. His father, Roger Charles Sullivan died on April 14, 1920. His son, Boetius Henry Sullivan, Jr. died on December 19, 1966.

Family
Boetius Sullivan married Mary Loretta Connery and had 5 children: Roger Charles Sullivan, Helen Sullivan Mckinley, Boetius Sullivan III, Mary Sullivan Griffin, and Jane Sullivan.

References

1885 births
1961 deaths
Yale University alumni
Harvard Law School alumni